Judah Christian School is a private, nondenominational Christian school in Champaign, Illinois, United States, located just south of the North Prospect business district. With a student body of just over 500, Judah Christian enrolls prekindergarten through 12th-grade students. As of the 2013–14 school year, the school offers three Advanced Placement courses.

History
"On February 18, 1983, parents concerned over the lack of Christian Education at the secondary level held an open meeting to plan a Christian high school for the Champaign-Urbana Community. They presented the following purpose and standards for such a school: '...to train young men and women – spiritually, mentally, and physically – in an environment of education excellence that will preserve and promote the standards and the faith taught in a Christ Centered home.

Later that fall, a Christian private school began for grades 7th through 10th. The plan was to include one more grade each year until JCS would become a private school program for grades seven through twelve. To help continue the growth of this new ministry, Urbana Assembly of Christ discontinued its 7th- and 8th-grade program and encouraged students to become involved with Judah. The school spent two years in the Webber Street Church facility, in Urbana.  The school then moved to its location on Prospect Avenue. Plans for expansion began when JCS bought 54 acres of land. Judah is accepting of all lifestyles, and is extremely inclusive. Judah has been nationally acknowledged for excellent academics.

Because of the request of several parents, the growth of Judah continued when in the spring of 1986 elementary grades became a part of the school.

During the autumn season of 1991 the Judah Christian School Society (JCSS) decided to add a preschool into Judah – making JCS a private Christian school schooling children from preschool through high school. 

In 1999 the school expanded the building which included a gymnasium, secondary classrooms (for math, science, etc.) and offices.

Sports

The school offers several sports such as football, basketball, and baseball. It has been announced that new athletic fields will be open for the 2014–2015 school year.

References

Buildings and structures in Champaign, Illinois
Christian schools in Illinois
Nondenominational Christian schools in the United States
Schools in Champaign County, Illinois